Stephan Aarstol is an American internet entrepreneur and author of the book The Five Hour Workday.

Life and early career
Aarstol grew up in Bellingham, Washington. In September 1999, Aarstol developed a web portal for the medical imaging community. In 2003, he launched a venture producing and selling high-end poker chips. Aarstol quit his day job the following year, by which time his venture was generating $50,000 per month.

Tower Paddle Boards
Aarstol founded Tower Paddle Boards in 2010. Aarstol pitched his business on Shark Tank in 2011. Mark Cuban made an offer and invested $150,000 for a 30% stake in Aarstol's company.
In 2013 and 2018, Aarstol was featured as one of Shark Tank's biggest winners by People Magazine. In addition to selling beach products, such as sunglasses, snorkels and surfboards, Aarstol is also the Editor-in-Chief of Tower Life Magazine, a biweekly publication that discusses beach lifestyle.

His company, was ranked San Diego's number one fastest growing private company in 2014. Jeff Bezos' 2015 annual letter to stockholders singles out Aarstol and his company. Aarstol was featured on ABC's Beyond the Tank in January 2016.

In November 2016, Harvard Business School professor Thales S. Teixeira published a case, study on Aarstol and Tower Paddle Boards titled "Selling on Amazon at Tower Paddle Boards". Aarstol has given several talks, at Harvard Business School on the topics of e-commerce and Amazon's role since its publication.

The Five Hour Workday
In June 2016, Aarstol published The Five Hour Workday, a book about switching his company to a five-hour workday and the benefits this change yielded in productivity.

References

21st-century American businesspeople
University of San Diego alumni
21st-century American male writers
Western Washington University alumni
Living people
Participants in American reality television series
Year of birth missing (living people)